The 1948 World Table Tennis Championships – Corbillon Cup (women's team) was the eighth edition of the women's team championship. 

England won the gold medal defeating Hungary 3–1 in the final. Czechoslovakia and Romania won bronze medals after finishing second in their respective groups.

Medalists

Team

Final tables

Group A

Group B

Final

See also
List of World Table Tennis Championships medalists

References

-
1948 in women's table tennis